Cruise is an Anglo-Norman surname which originated in England during Norman Conquest. It is a variant form of Cruce, Cruys, Cruse; others include Cruwys and Cruize. The surname Cruise was found in Bedfordshire (Old English: Bedanfordscir), located in Southeast-central England, formerly part of the Anglo-Saxon kingdom of Mercia.

In Ireland, Cruise is an old surname of Anglo-Norman origin which has been present there since the Anglo-Norman invasion in 1169. The family held lands in Counties Dublin and Meath. In early records the name is mostly spelled de Cruys/Cruys, and sometimes Cruce or Crues, but the spelling evolved to Cruise, and this is now the predominant spelling of the surname in Ireland today. Some time before 1176 Augustino de Cruce witnessed a grant by Strongbow of land in Dublin, and this is the earliest reference to the surname in Ireland found to date.

Frequency and distribution
Most prevalent in:  United States with 4,682 people.
Highest density in: Republic of Ireland 506 people (a frequency of 1:9,306) and 1,280th most common surname.

People with the surname Cruise
Conor Cruise O'Brien (1917-2008), Irish politician
Jack Cruise (1915-1979), Irish comedian and actor
Julee Cruise (1956–2022), American singer
Tom Cruise (1962), American actor and film producer

See also
Cruse (surname)
Cruz, Spanish surname with the same sound but unrelated, meaning "cross"

References

External links
 The Cruise one-name study

English-language surnames

de:Cruise
fr:Cruise
ko:크루즈
nl:Cruise
ja:クルーズ